The Giro del Medio Brenta is a professional one day cycling race held annually in Veneto, Italy. It has been part of the UCI Europe Tour since 2005 in category 1.2.

Winners

References

External links
 

Cycle races in Italy
UCI Europe Tour races
Recurring sporting events established in 1986
1986 establishments in Italy